Anax chloromelas, the dark emperor,  is a species of dragonfly in the family Aeshnidae. It is found in Cameroon, the Democratic Republic of the Congo, Malawi, Mozambique, Nigeria, Sierra Leone, Tanzania, Togo, Uganda, Zambia, and Zimbabwe. Its natural habitats are subtropical or tropical dry forests, subtropical or tropical moist lowland forests, and subtropical or tropical moist shrubland.

References

Aeshnidae
Odonata of Africa
Insects described in 1911
Taxonomy articles created by Polbot